Razan Ghazzawi (born 1980) is a Syrian-American blogger, campaigner and activist and currently a PhD researcher at the University of Sussex. She has been highly involved in the events during the Syrian Civil War, and has been particularly outspoken on activists' arrests and the violations of human rights committed by the Bashar al-Assad government. She was called "iconic blogger and leading activist" by The Telegraph. Jillian York (who has been called "one of the leading scholars on Internet control and censorship") wrote that Ghazzawi was "one of [her] heroes."

Education and career
Ghazzawi received a diploma in English literature from Damascus University in 2003. She obtained a master's degree in Comparative Literature from the University of Balamand in 2011. She started her career as a Translator and News Compiler for the Syrian Ministry of Foreign Affairs. She then worked in the Call Center of MTN Syria, but resigned because she discovered the company was corrupt. After this, she became the Media Officer in the Syrian Center for Media and Freedom of Expression in the Arab World.

As of 2017, she was a first year PhD candidate at the University of Sussex.

Activism and arrests
She was arrested by Syrian authorities on 30 November 2011 while on her way to attend a conference on press freedom in Jordan. The following week, she was brought to court, charged by authorities with trying to incite sectarian strife, spreading false information and weakening national sentiment, a charge often leveled against those who challenge the Syrian government, according to rights activists."

Her arrest sparked an online outcry and an international campaign called for her immediate release. There was a Facebook campaign for her release and Amnesty International has declared her a prisoner of conscience. Before her arrest, she declared in her blog, "Do you understand, that I was scared to protest, but now I am no longer scared?" She had also written: "If anything happens to me, know that the regime does not fear the prisoners but those who do not forget them."

On 19 December 2011, she was reported to have been freed, and her employer, the Syrian Centre for Media and Freedom of Expression, confirmed this.  However, she still faces the charges, which carry a maximum sentence of fifteen years imprisonment. Ghazzawi is one of few bloggers in Syria who write under their real names, even after her arrest.

Ghazzawi was again arrested on 16 February 2012, during a raid on the offices of the Syrian Center for Freedom of Expression in Damascus, where the activist works. Ghazzawi was arrested along with thirteen of her colleagues, including the Head of the Center, Mazen Darwish, and his wife Yara Bader. She was freed again on 18 February 2012, but she was not allowed to leave the country. Ghazzawi was ordered to report to the police on a daily basis in order to pursue her interrogation.

Awards and recognition
Razan Gazzawi was honoured with the 2012's Human Rights Defenders at Risk award by the Dublin-based Front Line Defenders foundation on 8 June 2012. Since she could not travel to Dublin due to restrictions on her, her colleague Dlshad Othman, who fled Syria in December 2011 accepted the award on her behalf. She was recognized as one of the BBC's 100 women of 2013.

References

External links

Twitter

People of the Syrian civil war
Syrian prisoners and detainees
Syrian bloggers
Syrian dissidents
Damascus University alumni
Living people
1980 births
Syrian emigrants to the United States
Syrian activists
Syrian women activists
University of Balamand alumni
BBC 100 Women
American people imprisoned abroad
Amnesty International prisoners of conscience held by Syria
Imprisoned journalists
Syrian women bloggers
Syrian women journalists
American women bloggers
American bloggers
American women journalists